Verde National Forest was established by the U.S. Forest Service in Arizona on December 30, 1907, with . On July 1, 1908, the forest was combined with Prescott National Forest and the name was discontinued.

References

External links
 Forest History Society
 Forest History Society:Listing of the National Forests of the United States Text from Davis, Richard C., ed. Encyclopedia of American Forest and Conservation History. New York: Macmillan Publishing Company for the Forest History Society, 1983. Vol. II, pp. 743–788.

Former National Forests of Arizona
Prescott National Forest